Prihova may refer to:
 Prihova, Nazarje, settlement on the left bank of the Savinja River immediately north of Nazarje in Slovenia.
 Prihova, Oplotnica, settlement in the Municipality of Oplotnica in northeastern Slovenia.